Sportin’ Life is the sixth and final studio album by the rock band Mink DeVille, released in 1985. Since the band's third album, 1981's Le Chat Bleu, when the original members of the band departed, lead singer and composer Willy DeVille had been assembling musicians to record and tour under the name Mink DeVille. After Sportin’ Life, Willy DeVille began recording and touring under his own name.

The album was recorded for Polydor at the Muscle Shoals Sound Studio in Muscle Shoals, Alabama. As he had done on Le Chat Bleu, DeVille wrote some songs with the Rock and Roll Hall of Fame member Doc Pomus. Members of the Muscle Shoals Rhythm Section — Roger Hawkins (drums), David Hood (bass), and Jimmy Johnson (guitar) — played on the album. Except for saxophonist Louis Cortelezzi, none of the musicians had played with Willy DeVille before.

The song  “Italian Shoes” was a hit in Europe.

Reviews

Trouser Press said about the album, “Sportin' Life maintains (high) standards with a set of brand-new oldies that effortlessly evoke the bygone era of sweet soul music. 'Something Beautiful Dying' (note The Righteous Brothers reference) is tenderly melancholic; 'Little by Little' tries barrelhouse rockabilly; 'Italian Shoes' is classic bad dude strutting. Apt self-production and a sharp backing band make this first-rate.”

Allmusic thought that the album suffered from overproduction and a lack of verve: "Sportin' Life is for the hardcore fan only, one who can appreciate DeVille’s canny and soulful songwriting that almost gets through this abortion of a production job.”

However, David Wild of Rolling Stone praised Sportin' Life, calling it "the most modern, polished sound of (Willy DeVille's) career." He added, "Pushed to center stage, DeVille delivers, singing with more passion and more personality than ever before... The songwriting is uniformly solid. 'In the Heart of the City' takes DeVille down a side street of Springsteen's musical neighborhood, and the album-closing 'Something Beautiful Is Dying' is a wonderfully overwrought ballad of heartbreaking elegance."

Collaboration with Doc Pomus
In Lonely Avenue, a biography of Doc Pomus, Alex Halberstadt wrote about the DeVille-Pomus composition "Something Beautiful Dying":

Track listing
Unless otherwise noted, all songs by Willy DeVille.
 “In the Heart of the City“ - 3:19
 “I Must Be Dreaming“ - 4:21
 “Italian Shoes“ - 4:23
 “Slip Away“ - 4:06
 “When You Walk My Way“ - (Willy DeVille, Doc Pomus) - 3:24
 “A Woman's Touch“ - 3:18
 “Easy Street“ - 3:30
 “Little By Little“ - 2:28
 “There's No Living (Without Your Loving)“  - (Jerry Harris, Paul Kaufman) - 3:21
 “Something Beautiful Dying“ – (Willy DeVille, Doc Pomus) - 3:39

Charts

Personnel
Ava Aldridge -  background vocals
Albert Boekholt - emulator
Mickey Buckins -  percussion
Duncan Cameron -  guitar, cuatro, background vocals
Louis Cortelezzi -  saxophone
Willy DeVille -  vocals, background vocals
Roger Hawkins -  drums
David Hood -  bass
Jim Horn -  saxophone
Wayne Jackson -  trumpet
Jimmy Johnson -  guitar
Boris Kinberg -  percussion
Micro Mini -  background vocals
Steve Nathan - keyboards
Cindy Richardson -  background vocals
Charles Rose -  trombone
Harvey Thompson -  saxophone
Mink DeVille Band (Kenny Margolis, Ricky Borgia, Louis Cortelezzi, Boris Kinberg, Shawn Murray, Bob Curiano)
Joe Elliott, Steve Clark, & Phil Collen of Def Leppard provided backing vocals for "Italian Shoes".

Production
 Michael Barnett - executive producer
 Duncan Cameron - co-producer
 Willy DeVille - producer
 Ronald Prent - recording engineer
 Charles Rose - arranger
 Greg Smith - arranger

References

1985 albums
Mink DeVille albums
Polydor Records albums
Albums recorded at Muscle Shoals Sound Studio